Zygote is the debut studio album by American singer-songwriter John Popper. Produced by Terry Manning, it was released on September 7, 1999, less than a month after the death of bassist Bobby Sheehan (Popper's friend and fellow member of the band Blues Traveler). Accompanying Popper on this album is Carter Beauford (of the Dave Matthews Band) on drums, and Crugie Riccio on guitar, Rob Clores, and Dave Ares (all of Cycomotogoat).

Track listing
Miserable Bastard (John Popper) – 7:25
Once You Wake Up (Popper) – 3:28
Growing in Dirt (Popper) - 4:23
Tip the Domino (Popper, Crugie Riccio) - 5:05
His Own Ideas (Popper) - 6:44
Home (Popper) - 4:00
Love for Free (Popper) - 4:04
How About Now? (Jonny Lang, Popper) - 3:07
Evil in My Chair (Popper) - 4:19
Lunatic (Popper, Riccio) - 6:24
Open Letter (Popper, Riccio) - 5:15
Fledgling (Popper) - 7:22

References

1999 debut albums
John Popper albums
Interscope Records albums
Albums produced by Terry Manning